Whiteley is a community near Fareham in the county of Hampshire, England.

Whiteley may also refer to:
Whiteley (surname)
Whiteley Bank, small village or hamlet on the Isle of Wight, England, UK
Whiteley Township, Pennsylvania, a township in Greene County, Pennsylvania, U.S.
Whiteley Village, in Hersham, Surrey, England, provides homes for needy elderly people
Whiteley Wood Hall, a stately home built by Alexander Ashton
Whiteley Primary School, a state-school near Fareham, Hampshire, England, UK
18839 Whiteley (1999 PG), a main-belt asteroid
Brett Whiteley Travelling Art Scholarship, an Australian annual art award
Whiteley Peak in Colorado, USA

See also
Huntington-Whiteley, a surname
Whiteleys, a shopping mall in Queensway, London, England, UK
Learoyd v Whiteley (1886), an English trusts law case